David Marshall (born March 14, 1985) is an American former professional ice hockey player. Marshall made his professional debut in 2009 and has played various teams in the AHL and the ECHL until ending his professional career in 2015.

Playing career
Born in Buffalo, Minnesota, Marshall played junior hockey for the Chicago Steel of the United States Hockey League (USHL). After junior, Marshall enrolled at Quinnipiac University, playing four seasons of college hockey. After graduating, Marshall signed with the Lake Erie Monsters, making his professional debut in March 2009.

During the 2011–12 season, Marshall was loaned from the Rio Grande Valley Killer Bees to the San Antonio Rampage in the American Hockey League where he remained for the duration of the season.

On September 6, 2012, Marshall returned to the ECHL, signing a one-year contract with the Reading Royals. During the 2012-13 season, whilst amongst the ECHL top scorers, Marshall was loaned to the Binghamton Senators on February 14, 2013. After a 6-game scoreless stint, Marshall was returned to the Royals briefly before he returned for a second stint in Charlotte, with the Checkers, for the duration of the season. Marshall appeared in 19 regular season and 2 post-season games with the Checkers before he was unable to return to the Royals championship run due to a complete roster. His name will still be engraved on the Kelly Cup.

On August 4, 2013, Marshall re-signed with the Reading Royals on a one-year deal. After two games with the Royals, Marshall was loaned to the Utica Comets where he remained for the duration of the 2013–14 season.

Career statistics

References

External links

1985 births
American men's ice hockey forwards
Binghamton Senators players
Charlotte Checkers (1993–2010) players
Charlotte Checkers (2010–) players
Chicago Steel players
Ice hockey players from Minnesota
Lake Erie Monsters players
Living people
Quinnipiac Bobcats men's ice hockey players
Reading Royals players
Rio Grande Valley Killer Bees players
Rochester Americans players
San Antonio Rampage players
Utica Comets players
Wheeling Nailers players
Wilkes-Barre/Scranton Penguins players
Worcester Sharks players
People from Buffalo, Minnesota